New York Proposition 1 may refer to:

 2017 New York Proposition 1, regarding the New York Constitution
 2021 New York Proposal 1, regarding the New York State Senate